Rugocaudia is a potentially dubious genus of basal titanosauriform sauropod dinosaur known from the Early Cretaceous of Montana, United States.

Discovery
Rugocaudia is known only from the holotype MOR 334, a partial postcranial skeleton which consist of 18 caudal vertebrae and associated material including isolated neural arch, tooth, chevron, and distal section of a metacarpal. It was collected from the Cloverly Formation, dating to the Aptian or the Albian stage of the Early Cretaceous.

Validity
Rugocaudia is considered to be a nomen dubium by D'Emic and Foreman.

Etymology
Rugocaudia was first described and named by D. Cary Woodruff in 2012 and the type species is Rugocaudia cooneyi. The generic name is deriverd from Latin ruga, "wrinkle" and cauda, "tail" in regards to the highly rugose posterior margins of the caudal vertebrae. The specific name honors the land owner J.P. Cooney.

References

Early Cretaceous dinosaurs of North America
Macronarians
Fossil taxa described in 2012
Cloverly fauna
Paleontology in Montana
Nomina dubia